The Navapolatsk tramway network is a public transport system in Navapolatsk, Belarus.

References

Tram transport in Belarus
Navapolatsk